This is the complete list of men's Olympic medalists in canoeing.

Current program

Slalom

C-1

K-1

Kayak cross

Sprint

C-1 1000 metres

C-2 500 metres

K-1 1000 metres

K-2 500 metres

K-4 500 metres

Discontinued events

Slalom

C-2

Sprint

C-1 200 metres

C-1 500 metres

C-1 10000 metres

C-2 1000 metres

C-2 10000 metres

K-1 200 metres

K-1 500 metres

K-1 10000 metres

K-1 4 × 500 metre relay

K-2 200 metres

K-2 1000 metres

K-2 10000 metres

K-4 1000 metres

K-1 (folding) 10000 metres

K-2 (folding) 10000 metres

References
 International Olympic Committee results database

Canoeing (men)
Canoeing (men)
medalists

Olympic